RTÉ News Channel (formerly RTÉ News Now) is an Irish free-to-air news television network operated by Raidió Teilifís Éireann (RTÉ). The channel launched as RTÉ News Now available exclusively online on 12 June 2008. The channel began broadcasting as a free-to-air channel on 29 October 2010 on Saorview.

The channel broadcasts free-to-air and commercial-free. It is available in Ireland and globally online, on mobile phones and an iPhone/iPad application is also widely available free. It is operated by RTÉ's department RTÉ News and Current Affairs and broadcasts in the Irish, English and ISL languages.

The channel was rebranded from RTÉ News Now to RTÉ News channel in August 2020 with minor changes to its programming line-up. As part of the rebrand, the channel is complemented with a new-look app.

History
RTÉ News NOW was originally available only to online users of the RTÉ website and on mobile phones when the channel launched on 12 June 2008. Availability of the channel improved during test trials of Saorview in December 2009. The channel was made available since May 2010 on train services within Dublin city and surrounding regions under a special agreement between CIÉ and RTÉ. Previously, Sky News provided such a service. 
Since October 29, 2010 the channel is available free-to-air to 98% of homes throughout the Republic of Ireland through Saorview. Upon the announcement in February 2011 that RTÉ News NOW would become a permanent fixture to the Saorview line-up a number of media organizations criticized such a move claiming RTÉ would continue to have a monopoly over news output within Ireland.

In 2017, Head of News and Current Affairs at RTÉ Jon Williams suggested that he could discontinue RTÉ News Now to save money and therefore in August 2020, he re-branded the channel as RTÉ News.

In 2022 RTÉ Radio developed two visual news rooms from which Morning Ireland and This Week broadcast from.

Advertising

RTÉ News  is currently one of two RTÉ channels that does not carry advertising. The other being RTÉjr. In January 2015, it was reported that RTÉ intend to ask the Minister for Communications to allow them carry advertising on RTÉ News Now as part of an overhaul of the service. Such a proposal needs government approval.

Format
The channel regularly simulcasts live news bulletins and current affairs programmes as they are broadcast on RTÉ One, and also that of the children's news programme RTÉ News2Day which airs on RTÉ2. The remaining programming on the channel serves as a replay service of the most recent news, sport and weather bulletins, the streaming of raw feeds of breaking news stories and 'filler' programmes such as 'news headlines'. The channel also airs the latest breaking news stories from Ireland and around the world.

Scheduling
The channel airs live news programmes such as Six One, as they are broadcast on other RTÉ channels, along with weather forecasts. During other periods, live current affairs programmes such as Prime Time are shown. Outside of these hours the most recent show is repeated, looped, unless interrupted by live feeds of breaking news stories. Up-to-the-minute financial data and weather are also broadcast on-air. As with many other stations, a live ticker is provided, across the bottom of the screen, providing headlines sourced from content on the broadcaster's website.

RTÉ have a number of bulletins on the channel that do not air on RTÉ One or RTÉ Two; they also provide a live Irish language news bulletin at 17:00 each weekday. They provide special reports from different news and current affairs programming, this is identified as RTÉ News Now Highlights. News2Day also appears on the channel.

RTÉ have proposed some other changes to the RTÉ News Now schedule:
 Television news bulletins at 08:00 and 09:00 during Morning Ireland
 Sporting events that RTÉ have rights to but cannot currently provide coverage due to scheduling conflicts
 Extra sporting analysis that currently runs on RTÉ's live Internet service
There are no TV news bulletins on RTÉ News, television news starts at 13:00 with the One O'Clock news while it ends at 21:30 with the Nine News and mid-week with Current Affairs programming at 22:30.

Programming
The channel broadcasts a mix of news and current affairs shows.

News
The channel airs the following RTÉ news programmes live:
Morning Ireland
RTÉ News: One O'Clock 
RTÉ News: Six One
RTÉ News: Nine O'Clock
Nuacht RTÉ at 17.00 and at 17.40 (Irish language) (including RTÉ News with Signing)
News2day (Children's news bulletin)

Regular news bulletins and weather forecasts shown on RTÉ One and Two throughout the day are also simulcast on RTÉ News Now.

Former RTÉ news programmes 

 RTÉ News @ 10:00, 11:00, 12:00, 15.00, 16.00 & 23:00
 RTÉ News on 2

Typical Weekday Schedule
As of August 2020, the following is a typical weekday schedule currently broadcast on the channel:

 07.00 – Morning Ireland: simulcast of the RTÉ Radio 1 show
 09.00 – Good Morning Europe: simulcast of euronews
 10.00 – Today with Claire Byrne
 11.00 – Latest News and Weather: repeated on a loop for the rest of the hour
 12.00 – Latest News and Weather: repeated on a loop for the rest of the hour
 13:00 – RTÉ News: One O'Clock. Live simulcast of RTÉ One's lunchtime news bulletin 
 13.30 – The One O'Clock News is repeated on a loop until 15:00
 15:00 – Latest News and Weather 
 16:00 – Latest News and Weather, repeated on a loop for the rest of the hour (includes live simulcast of News2day at 16:45)
 17:00 – Nuacht RTÉ le TG4, repeated on a loop until 17.40
 17:40 – Nuacht RTÉ le TG4 and News with ISL: Live simulcast with RTÉ One
 18:01 – RTÉ News: Six One: Live simulcast of RTÉ One's flagship evening news bulletin
 19:00 – Latest News and Weather
 20:00 – Nuacht TG4
 21:00 – RTÉ News: Nine O'Clock: Live simulcast of RTÉ One's nightly news bulletin
 21:35 – Claire Byrne Live (Monday) / Prime Time (Tuesday/Thursday) / Latest News and Weather (Wednesday, Friday to Sunday) 
 22:10 – Latest News and Weather 
 23:00 – RTÉ News Update / Prime Time
 23:30 – Nuacht TG4
 23:50 – euronews simulcast until 07:00

Raw Politics
euronews' Raw Politics broadcast on the channel each day from November 2018 airing separate to the Euronews channel, before the show was cancelled by euronews.

Breaking news
The channel provides analysis of breaking news stories domestically and internationally.

Overnight and special simulcasts
RTÉ News channel simulcasts Euronews from 23:00 to 7:00 every day.

RTÉ Weather
RTÉ Weather provides the channel with weather updates, some updates are a re-broadcast of what has previously aired across RTÉ television or updates produced specific to the channel. Due to commercial advertising being prohibited from the channel weather updates have no sponsorship unlike other updates across RTÉ television and radio.

RTÉ Entertainment
RTÉ Entertainment (formally called RTÉ TEN (The Entertainment Network)) provides viewers with up-to-the minute showbiz news from music reviews, interviews, film premieres and more. The show airs daily and hosts a weekly round-up show each weekend.

Current affairs
It broadcasts these current affairs shows:

24-hour television news channels
Internet television channels
RTÉ News and Current Affairs
News Now
News Now
Commercial-free television networks
Television channels and stations established in 2008
2008 establishments in Ireland